The women's 5000 metres event at the 2019 African Games was held on 26 August in Rabat.

Results

References

5000
2019 in women's athletics